XHGAL-FM (93.7 FM) is a radio station in Galeana, Nuevo León, known as Vive FM. XHGAL is part of the Nuevo León state-owned Radio Nuevo León public network.

References

Radio stations in Nuevo León